The 2021 U.S. Classic, known as the 2021 GK U.S. Classic for sponsorship reasons, is the 37th edition of the U.S. Classic gymnastics tournament. The competition was held on May 21–22, 2021, at the Indiana Convention Center in Indianapolis, Indiana.

Medalists

Results

Seniors

Juniors

Participants

Seniors

 Ciena Alipio – San Jose, California (Midwest Gymnastics Center)
 Sydney Barros – Lewisville, Texas (World Champions Centre)
 Simone Biles – Spring, Texas (World Champions Centre)
 Skye Blakely – Frisco, Texas (WOGA Gymnastics)
 Sophia Butler – Houston, Texas (Discover Gymnastics)
 Jade Carey – Phoenix, Arizona (Arizona Sunrays)
 Jordan Chiles – Spring, Texas (World Champions Centre)
 Kayla DiCello – Boyds, Maryland (Hill's Gymnastics)
 Skylar Draser – Breinigsville, Pennsylvania (Parkettes)
 Amari Drayton – Spring, Texas (World Champions Centre)
 Kara Eaker – Grain Valley, Missouri (GAGE)
 Addison Fatta – Wrightsville, Pennsylvania (Prestige Gymnastics)
 Aleah Finnegan – Lee's Summit, Missouri (GAGE)
 eMjae Frazier – Erial, New Jersey (Parkettes)
 Karis German – Spring, Texas (World Champions Centre)
 Laurie Hernandez – Old Bridge, New Jersey (Gym-Max Gymnastics)
 Morgan Hurd – Middletown, Delaware (First State Gymnastics)
 Shilese Jones – Westerville, Ohio (Future Gymnastics Academy)
 Hailey Klein – Lake Forest, Illinois (Flips Gymnastics North Shore)
 Alonna Kratzer – Suwanee, Georgia (Top Notch Training Center)
 Temple Landry – Maple Grove, Minnesota (Twin City Twisters)
 Emily Lee – Los Gatos, California (West Valley Gymnastics School)
 Sunisa Lee – St. Paul, Minnesota (Midwest Gymnastics Center)
 Lauren Little – Mooresville, North Carolina (Everest Gymnastics)
 Emma Malabuyo – Flower Mound, Texas (Texas Dreams Gymnastics)
 Grace McCallum – Isanti, Minnesota (Twin City Twisters)
 Konnor McClain – Cross Lanes, West Virginia (Revolution Gymnastics)
 Riley McCusker – Brielle, New Jersey (Arizona Sunrays)
 Chellsie Memmel – Dousman, Wisconsin (M and M Gymnastics)
 Zoe Miller – Spring, Texas (World Champions Centre)
 Kaylen Morgan – Huntersville, North Carolina (Everest Gymnastics)
 Elle Mueller – Ham Lake, Minnesota (Twin City Twisters)
 Anya Pilgrim – Germantown, Maryland (Hill's Gymnastics)
 Katelyn Rosen – Boerne, Texas (Mavericks Gymnastics)
 Lyden Saltness – Chisago City, Minnesota (Midwest Gymnastics Center)
 Jamison Sears – Yorktown, Virginia (World Class Gymnastics)
 Ava Siegfeldt – Williamsburg, Virginia (World Class Gymnastics)
 MyKayla Skinner – Gilbert, Arizona (Desert Lights Gymnastics)
 Faith Torrez – Bristol, Wisconsin (Legacy Elite Gymnastics)
 Mya Witte – Greenacres, Florida (Genie's Gymnastics)
 Leanne Wong – Overland Park, Kansas (GAGE)
 Lexi Zeiss – Omaha, Nebraska (Omaha Gymnastics Academy)

Juniors 

 Charlotte Booth – Clermont, Florida (Brandy Johnson's) 
 Sage Bradford – Flower Mound, Texas (WOGA Gymnastics)  
 Kailin Chio – Henderson, Nevada (Gymcats Gymnastics)   
 Madray Johnson – Dallas, Texas (WOGA Gymnastics)   
 Katelyn Jong – Allen, Texas (Metroplex Gymnastics)   
 Avery King – Dallas, Texas (WOGA Gymnastics)   
 Kaliya Lincoln – Frisco, Texas (WOGA Gymnastics)   
 Nola Matthews – Gilroy, California (Airborne Gymnastics) 
 Zoey Molomo – Frisco, Texas (Metroplex Gymnastics)   
 Ella Murphy – Frisco, Texas (WOGA Gymnastics)   
 Ella Kate Parker  – West Chester, Ohio (Cincinnati Gymnastics) 
 Azaraya Ra-Akbar – Columbia, Maryland (World Class Gymnastics)  
 Autumn Reingold – Van Nuys, California (Gymnastics Olympica USA) 
 Joscelyn Roberson – Texarkana, Texas (North East Texas Elite)
 Paloma Spiridonova – Torrance, California (WOGA Gymnastics)   
 Izzy Stassi – North Royalton, Ohio (Gym X-Treme)  
 Tiana Sumanasekera – Pleasanton, California (West Valley) 
 Lucy Tobia – Schnecksville, Pennsylvania (Parkettes) 
 Gabriella Van Frayen – Lewis Center, Ohio (Gym X-Treme) 
 Paityn Walker – Hercules, California (Head Over Heels)

References 

U.S. Classic
U.S. Classic
U.S. Classic
U.S. Classic
U.S. Classic